Auguste Luchet (22 April 1806 – 9 March 1872) was a 19th-century French playwright, journalist, novelist and writer.

Biography 

The son of a civil servant, Luchet was raised in Dieppe where his parents had moved in 1813. A brilliant student but from a family with no fortune, he was placed aged 13 in an office of the Dieppe court of justice. He then worked by a ship owner and a banker and, in 1823, decided to leave for Paris where he wanted to go into literature. He was then employed by a merchant of the rue Saint-Martin, which completely disgusted him with the trading world, a feeling he expressed later in his autobiographical novel Frère et soeur. He spent some time by a merchant of sheets before getting into journalism.

Unfortunately, he soon found himself homeless and spent two years in misery before finding a stenographer position at the Chamber of Deputies where he met, among others, Alphonse Rabbe, Louis Reybaud and Léon Gozlan who allowed him to enter their political review La Jeune France.

Spotted by Jacques Coste, he became a journalist at Le Temps, then joined the Journal de Paris and took an active part to the July Revolution of 1830, which earned him a five-year exile in Belgium, then in Jersey. A collaborator with Talisman, Le Siècle (1849), the Républicain de Seine-et-Marne (1850) and the magazine La Vigne (1866), his plays were given on the most prestigious Parisian stages of his time including the Théâtre de l'Ambigu-Comique, the Théâtre de la Porte-Saint-Martin, and the Théâtre Beaumarchais.

In addition to some novels, he also wrote books on vine and wine. Luchet was also the governor of the château de Fontainebleau (1848). His novel Le Nom de famille earned him a two-year prison sentence and a 1000 frs fine  His defendant was Jules Favre.

Luchet is buried at Père Lachaise Cemetery (49th division). His bronze bust is listed in French patrimony.

Works 
1830: Paris, esquisses dédiées au peuple parisien et à M. J.-A. Dulaure
1832: Henri le prétendant, novel, Canel
1834: Le Brigand et le philosophe, drama in 5 actions, with Félix Pyat
1835: Ango, drama in 5 acts, six tableaux, with an epilogue, with Pyat
1835: Un Mariage de cour, crime et silence, Souverain
1836: Thadéus le ressuscité, with Michel Masson, Boulé
1838: Frère et sœur, novel, 2 vols., Souverain
1840: Justes frayeurs d'un habitant de la banlieue à propos des fortifications de Paris
1840: Récit de l'inauguration de la statue de Gutenberg et des fêtes données par la ville de Strasbourg les 24, 25 et 26 juin 1840, Pagnerre
1842: Le Nom de famille, 2 vols., Souverain
1844: Le Passe-partout, 2 vols., Souverain
1847: Le Confessionnal de sœur Marie, Souverain
1847: Souvenirs de Jersey, guide du voyageur français dans cette île
1848: Souvenirs de Fontainebleau, Reullier
1854: Le Cordonnier de Crécy, five-act drama, with Charles Vincent, music by Olivier Métra
1855: Fontainebleau, paysages, légendes, souvenirs, fantaisies, Hachette
1856: La Marchande du Temple, five-act drama
1858: Les mœurs d'aujourd'hui : le tabac, le jeu, le canot, le pourboire, la blague, la pose, le chantage, le loyer, la boutique, l'exil, Coulon-Pineau
1858: La Côte-d'Or à vol d'oiseau, lettres écrites à M. L. Havin, après la récolte de 1857, Michel-Lévy
1859: Le Clos de Vougeot et la Romanée-Conti, Bénard
1861: La Science du vin, lettres écrites à M. L. Havin, après la récolte de 1859, Michel-Lévy Frères
1862: Les mauvais côtés de la vie, souvenirs d'exil, Dentu
1868: L'art industriel à l'Exposition universelle de 1867 : mobilier, vêtement, aliments
1869: Album révolutionnaire, Proux

Bibliography 
 Alfred Sirven, Journaux et journalistes, vol.3, 1866, (p. 334)
 Polybiblion: revue bibliographique universelle, 1872, (p. 127) (obituary)
 Ludovic Lalanne, Dictionnaire historique de la France, 1872, (p. 1840)
 Henry Jouin, La sculpture dans les cimetières de Paris, Nouvelles archives de l'art français vol.13, 1897, (p. 159)
 Jules Moiroux, Le cimetière du Père-Lachaise, 1908, (p. 234)
 Félix Herbet, Auguste Luchet (1805-1872), étude bio-bibliographique, 1912

References

External links 
 Auguste Luchet on data.bnf.fr
 Auguste Luchet on Wikisource

19th-century French dramatists and playwrights
19th-century French journalists
French male journalists
19th-century French novelists
1806 births
Writers from Paris
1872 deaths
Burials at Père Lachaise Cemetery
19th-century French male writers